Kushiro is a city in Kushiro subprefecture, Hokkaido in Japan. It may also refer to:

Education
 Kushiro Junior College, a private junior college in Kushiro, Hokkaido, Japan
 Kushiro Public University of Economics, a university in Kushiro, Hokkaido, Japan
 Hokkaido Kushiro Koryo High School, a high school in Kushiro, Hokkaido, Japan

Municipalities and political divisions
 Kushiro Province, a former province in Hokkaido, Japan
 Kushiro Subprefecture, a subprefecture of Hokkaido prefecture in Japan
 Kushiro District, Hokkaido, a district within the same-named subprefecture
 Kushiro (town), a town in Kushiro subprefecture in Japan

Transportation
 Kushiro Airport, a small international airport near Kushiro, Hokkaido, Japan
 Kushiro Freight Terminal, a JR Freight terminal adjacent to Shin-Fuji Station in Kushiro, Hokkaido, Japan
 Kushiro Station (Hokkaido), a JR Hokkaido train station in Kushiro, Hokkaido, Japan
 Kushiro Station (Shimane), a JR West train station in Hamada, Shimane Prefecture, Japan
 Kushiro-Shitsugen Station, a JR Hokkaido train station in Kushiro Town, Hokkaido, Japan
 Kushiro Sotokan Road, a two-lane national expressway in Kushiro Subprefecture, Hokkaido, Japan
 Higashi-Kushiro Station, a JR Hokkaido train station in Kushiro, Hokkaido, Japan

Other
 Kushiro Ice Arena, an arena in Kushiro, Hokkaido, Japan
 Kushiro Observatory, an observatory in Kushiro, Hokkaido, Japan
 Kushiro River, a river in Hokkaido, Japan
 4096 Kushiro, a minor planet